is a private university in Hiroshima, Hiroshima, Japan. The predecessor of the school was established in 1939, and it was chartered as a university in 1994.

External links
 Official website 

Educational institutions established in 1939
Private universities and colleges in Japan
Universities and colleges in Hiroshima Prefecture
1939 establishments in Japan